Seán O'Shea (Irish: Seán Ó Sé) (born 17 July 1998) is an Irish Gaelic footballer who plays for Kerry SFC club Kenmare Shamrocks and at inter-county level with the Kerry senior football team. He usually lines out as a forward.

Career
O'Shea played Gaelic football at juvenile and underage levels with the Kenmare Shamrocks club. He eventually progressed onto the club's intermediate team and scored 1-05 when the club won the Munster Club Championship title in 2016. O'Shea first appeared on the inter-county scene during a two year-stint with the Kerry minor football team. He won consecutive All-Ireland Minor Championships during this time, including one as captain of the team in 2016. He subsequently progressed onto the under-21 team and also won a Sigerson Cup title with University College Cork in 2019. O'Shea made his debut with the Kerry senior football team during the 2018 National League. His immediately established himself on the team and was named Young Footballer of the Year in 2019. O'Shea's other honours include three Munster Championships and two National League titles.

On 10 July 2022, in the All-Ireland semi-final against Dublin, O'Shea scored a 53m free with the last kick of the game to win the game for Kerry, 1-14 to 1-13 and qualify for the 2022 All-Ireland Final.

He captained Kerry in the 2022 All-Ireland season and lifted the Sam Maguire Cup, following the county's victory over Galway in the All-Ireland Senior Football Championship Final.

Personal life
O'Shea is dating Molly O'Brien, the sister of Kenmare and Kerry teammate Stephen O'Brien.

Career statistics

Honours
University College Cork
Sigerson Cup: 2019

Kenmare Shamrocks
Munster Intermediate Club Football Championship: 2016
Kerry Intermediate Football Championship: 2016

Kerry
All-Ireland Senior Football Championship (1): 2022 (c)
Munster Senior Football Championship: 2018, 2019, 2021, 2022 (c)
National Football League: 2020, 2021, 2022
McGrath Cup: 2022 (c)
Munster Under-21 Football Championship: 2017
All-Ireland Minor Football Championship: 2015, 2016 (c)
Munster Minor Football Championship: 2015, 2016 (c)

Individual
GAA GPA All Stars Awards (2): 2019, 2022
The Sunday Game Team of the Year (2): 2019, 2022

References

1998 births
Living people
All Stars Awards winners (football)
Gaelic football forwards
Irish schoolteachers
Kenmare Shamrocks Gaelic footballers
Kerry inter-county Gaelic footballers
UCC Gaelic footballers